Dirk Leo Van der Maelen (born 14 March 1953) is a Belgian politician for the SP.A.

Biography
Van der Maelen was born in Geraardsbergen. He has been a member of the Chamber of Representatives since 1989, where he specialised himself in finances and defence. Between 1999 and 2007 he served as faction leader of his party. Van der Maelen is also a member of the town council of his hometown Geraardsbergen. In 2010 the Flemish newspaper De Morgen called him the best parliamentarian of the previous legislature, with a score of 4.5/5.

External links
 

Living people
1953 births
Flemish politicians
Socialistische Partij Anders politicians
20th-century Belgian politicians
21st-century Belgian politicians
People from Geraardsbergen